Circle Theatre or Circle Theater may refer to:

Concept
 Theatre-in-the-round, arena theatre, or central staging is any theatre space in which the audience surrounds the stage area, often in the shape of a circle theatre and sometimes named as such

Theatres
Circle in the Square Theatre, a Broadway theater in New York City
Circle in the Square Theatre School, school associated with the Broadway theater
Circle X Theatre, Hollywood, California
Circle Theater (Indianapolis, Indiana), listed on the National Register of Historic Places in Indiana
El Centro Theatre, founded as the Circle Theatre in Hollywood, California
Hilbert Circle Theatre, formerly known as Circle Theatre, a historic theatre in Oklahoma
Circle Theatre Chicago, founded in 1985, is a theatre company in Chicago, Illinois

Media
Armstrong Circle Theatre, an American drama television series that ran during 1950 to 1957

See also
Dress circle, balcony seating in a theatre